Andreas Bang Hemmeth (born 1979 in Copenhagen, Denmark), better known as DJ Encore, is a Danish songwriter, music artist and journalist. He is currently head of press for the Danish Social Liberal Party (Radikale Venstre).

He has been at the top of the charts in Denmark, USA, UK, Sweden, Norway, Finland, Brazil and France in various projects including DJ Encore, Tik Tak, C21, FF and LeAnn Rimes.

His best result was a first place on the American Billboard charts with a remix of a single for the American artist Res. Hemmeth was also in the top of the charts in Britain with two remixes for artists LeAnn Rimes and Frou Frou.

As the artist DJ Encore, Hemmeth was rewarded with double platinum for the single "I see right through to you” in his home country Denmark, where the song also was used as a soundtrack for the reality show Big Brother. The song was the precursor to his debut album "Intuition" with vocalist Engelina. It was released in 2001 in Denmark and in the rest of the world the following year. The album also contained the hits "Walking in the Sky" and "High on Life". DJ Encore and Engelina went on a tour that included more than 100 concerts in Denmark including one of Northern Europes biggest festivals Grøn Koncert. They also played many concerts in the US, Canada, England and Germany.

His second album, Unique, on which Swedish Johanna Stedt is singing, was released in the United States and Canada in 2007. The DJ Encore project has sold more than 350,000 copies worldwide.

As a songwriter and producer Hemmeth has contributed to a number of hits for other artists. Amongst others "Spirit of Christmas" which he co-wrote with the boy band C21. It was awarded 5 times platinum. Hemmeth was also certified platinum for songs written to the Finnish rock band Tiktak, Portuguese FF and a gold record for club project Laze. He also took part in the Danish Eurovision Song Contest in 2008.

Hemmeth has a total of 13 platinum records, three gold records and two awards for his music career.

Hemmeth graduated from Aurehøj Gymnasium in 1998 and have a university degree in economics from Roskilde University.

He began working for the Danish Social Liberal Party as a press officer in 2010, became head of press and special advisor to the Minister of Culture, Marianne Jelved in December 2012 and towards the end of 2013 returned to the Danish Social Liberal Party where he is currently head of press.

Hemmeth is a member of Mensa.

Discography

Albums
Intuition (2001)
 Ultra.Dance 02 (DJ compilation) (2002)
Unique (2007)

Singles
as DJ Encore
"I See Right Through to You" (2001)
"Walking in the Sky" (2002)
"High on Life" (2002)
"You've Got a Way" (2002)
"You Can Walk on Water" (2007)
"Out There" (2007)
"Falling" (2008)

Songwriting
"There's someone watching" by Saphire (2003)
"Steppin' Out" by Laze (2003)
"Mænd uden slips" by Lasse Tyr (2003)
"Spirit of Christmas" by C21 (2005)
"Catfight" by Katerine (2005)
"2much4you" by Katerine (2005)
"Be a star" by Natalie (2005)
"Here comes the rain again" by DJ Aligator (2005)
"This is how we do it" by Chipz (2005)
"Twist of fate" by Tik Tak (2005)
"Music Rules" by Party's cool (2006)
"Hvis du vidste" by Europæisk Ungdom (2006)
"5 Steps to loneliness" by FF (2006)
"Let you go" by FF (2006)
"Electric Eyes" by Søren Bregendal (2007)
"Twist of fate" by Jam Hsiao (2007)
"Nebojim Se" by Ewa Farna (2007)
"Kocka Na Rozpaleny" by Ewa Farna (2007)
"Den jeg er" by Charlie (2008)
"Boys today" by Ella (2008)
"Når Danmark trykker af" - 'Se og Hørs' EM-song (2012)
"Starcruiser" af NORD (2017)
"Hello" af NORD (2017)
"Alive" af NORD (2018)
"Patience" af Jake & Almo (2019)
"See things clearer" af Jake & Almo (2019)

Remixes
"Shook Shook Shook" by Awe Manneh (1999)
"Queen of the night" by Superstar (1999)
"Soulsearcher" by North (2000)
"AB-sangen" by Michael Falch (2000)
"Moonchild" by DoubleN (2000)
"Mr. DJ" S.O.A.P. - (DJ Encore Club Mix) (2000)
"Take my breath away" by Berlin (2002)
"Anyway" by Amber (2002)
"Suddenly" by LeeAnn Rimes (2002)
"Breathe in" by Frou Frou (2002)
"They Say Vision" by RES (2002)
"Fire in your eyes" by Two Face (2002)
"Those left behind" by Zenith (2002)
"Dust.wav" by Perpetouos Dreamer (2003)
"This side up" by Jon (Danish Popstar winner) (2003)
"Because the night" by Jan Wayne (2003)
"Behind blue eyes" by Limp Bizkit (2004)
"Stay" by Mynt (2005)
"Humanimosity" by Zenith (2006)
"Vampire Boy" by Sunny (van der remix) (2010)

References

External links
DJ Encore at Koch Records
DJ Encore at Discogs
[ DJ Encore] at Allmusic

Living people
Danish DJs
Danish songwriters
Musicians from Copenhagen
1979 births
Electronic dance music DJs